Reuben Raya Rivera Silitonga (born 27 March 1991), is an Indonesian professional footballer who plays as a defender for Persikab Bandung.

Early career
Silitonga is a former youth player of Villa 2000.

Club career
In 2014, Silitonga started his career with Denmark club Tjørring IF.

He was signed for Global Cebu to play in United Football League in the 2014 season.

After his release from Global Cebu, Silitonga signed with United Football League club Layola on September 21, 2014

Silitonga was released by Layola in January 2015.

Silitonga was released by Stallion Laguna in 2016. He switched his focus to being an entrepreneur and left football. In 2021, after 5 years of absence Reuben returned to the world of football.

He was signed for Indonesian Liga 2 club Persis Solo.

Honours

Club 
Bali United
 Liga 1: 2021–22

References

External links
 Reuben Silitonga at Soccerway

1991 births
Living people
Indonesian footballers
Association football defenders
Bali United F.C. players
Indonesian expatriate footballers